White piedra (or tinea blanca) is a mycosis of the hair caused by several species of fungi in the genus Trichosporon. It is characterized by soft nodules composed of yeast cells and arthroconidia that encompass hair shafts.

Signs and symptoms
White piedra is asymptomatic.

Diagnosis

White piedra is caused by Trichosporon beigelii. White piedra can occur on the hair of the scalp; Trichosporon ovoides is likely the cause in this case. White piedra on scalp hair is rarely caused by Trichosporon inkin; pubic hair with white piedra is what T. inkin is mainly associated with. White piedra can occur on pubic hair; T. inkin likely causes this.

Treatment
There are several approaches to treat this infectious disease. One approach involves shaving the affected areas. Another approach involves the use of antifungal medication.

See also 
 Trichobacteriosis axillaris

References

External links 

 

Mycosis-related cutaneous conditions
Human hair